Sverdlov (formerly, Aydarbek) is a village in the Lori Province of Armenia.

Sverdlov is situated on the Urut River, 12 km north-east of Alaverdi and 48 km from Vanadzor.

The village dates back to 18th century, 6 km on north-east from Manstev monastery (located in Teghut village). Although the village is much older than assumed, because it was a center of tuff and basalt mining from 5th to 7th century.

Sverdlov hosts the 6th century St. George Church, which was demolished and rebuilt in 19th century, then renovated and re-consecrated in 2010. The chapel of the church is dated to the 13th century. There are also preserved cemetery ruins.

Sverdlov has a mountain climate, with severely cold winters, cool summers and frequent rainfall and hail.

Residents are mainly engaged in livestock breeding and growing grains, potatoes, melons and pumpkin. Meadows and pastures are located at around 1900–2400 meters above the sea level. Medium steep slopes with alpine or subalpine climate are favorable conditions for livestock pasture.

References
http://armccms.org/index.php?option=com_content&view=article&id=105%3A2014-07-21-15-06-22&catid=32%3Acommunities&Itemid=50&lang=en

Populated places in Lori Province